Louise Stephanie Watkin (née Niklasson; born 13 August 1992 in Stockholm, Sweden) is a British Paralympic swimmer. Watkin swims in the S9 category and represented Great Britain in the 2012 Summer Paralympics, in which she won two silver and two bronze medals. She won one silver and three bronze medals at the 2008 Paralympics in Beijing.

Career history
She came to the UK in 1996.  She was born with Upper Limb Deficiency, and is missing her left hand. After trying out several sports and activities as a child, she settled on swimming at the age of 12.

Her first major competition was the World Championships in Durban, South Africa in 2006, and since then she has competed in the Beijing Paralympic Games in 2008, the European Championships in Reykjavik in 2009, and also the World Short Course Championships in Rio (also in 2009).

At the Beijing Paralympics, despite being only just 16, she won 1 silver and 3 bronze medals.

As of August 2012, Watkin is ranked no 1 in the world in 50m freestyle.

She is also ranked 3rd in the 100m freestyle, 2nd in the 200m IM, 8th in the 100m breastroke, and 10th in the 100m backstroke,

Between 15 and 21 August 2010, she competed in the World Championships, in Eindhoven, Netherlands, where she became world champion in 50m freestyle, beating world record holder Natalie Du Toit. She also won a silver medal in the 200m IM, 100m breaststroke, and the 4 × 100 m freestyle relay (34pts). Watkin also won a bronze medal in the 100m freestyle.

She is the European record holder for 100m freestyle (1 min 03.07 secs) and 200 I.M. (2 min 35.99 secs)

She used to train at the City of Salford Swimming Club full-time under the Salford Competitive Training Scheme, and was coached by John Stout, who was selected as the coach for Paralympics GB Swimming Team at the London 2012 Paralympic Games. However, Louise Watkin (and fellow medallist Heather Frederiksen) are looking for a new club after quitting City of Salford swim team after, according to BBC Sport, a breakdown in the relationship with coach John Stout.

In her first event, she won a bronze medal as a member of the Women's 4 x 100 metre freestyle relay 34pts team.
She then won silver in the 50m freestyle S9 and bronze in the 200m individual medley SM9 events, before getting a silver medal in the Women's 4 x 100 metre medley relay 34pts.

References

External links

Profile at English Federation of Disabled sport
 Profile at ParalympicsGB

1992 births
Living people
Swimmers at the 2008 Summer Paralympics
Swimmers at the 2012 Summer Paralympics
Paralympic bronze medalists for Great Britain
Paralympic silver medalists for Great Britain
Paralympic swimmers of Great Britain
British amputees
Swedish amputees
Swimmers from Stockholm
Swedish emigrants to the United Kingdom
Medalists at the 2008 Summer Paralympics
Medalists at the 2012 Summer Paralympics
S9-classified Paralympic swimmers
Medalists at the World Para Swimming Championships
Medalists at the World Para Swimming European Championships
Paralympic medalists in swimming
British female freestyle swimmers
British female medley swimmers
21st-century British women